Trupejevo Poldne (1931 m) is a peak in the Western Karawanks, on the border between Slovenia and Austria. From the Slovene side it is accessible from the settlement of Gozd Martuljek via Srednji vrh. From the Austrian side a road from the village of Tetchanting, south of Villach, from which it gets its German name, leads to mountain pastures under the peak. It gets its Slovene name from the Trupej farmstead to the north of the summit, on the Austrian side. It is visited by hikers and is also suitable for ski touring in winter and spring.

The summit offers nice views across the Upper Sava Valley towards Špik in the Julian Alps on the Slovene side and into Carinthia on the Austrian side. Neighbouring peaks in the Karawanks include Maloško Poldne / Mallestiger Mittagskogel (1828 m) and Kepa/Mittagskogel (2143 m) to the east and Mojstrovica (1816 m) and Visoki Kurji vrh (1828 m) to the southeast.

References

External links 
 Trupejevo Poldne on Geopedia
 Information about Trupejevo Poldne with maps and hiking routes on Hribi.net

Mountains of Upper Carniola
Karawanks
One-thousanders of Austria
Municipality of Kranjska Gora
One-thousanders of Slovenia
Mountains of the Alps